Cerceris kennicottii is a species of wasp in the family Crabronidae. It is found in Central America and North America.

Subspecies
These two subspecies belong to the species Cerceris kennicottii:
 Cerceris kennicottii chinandegaensis Cameron, 1904
 Cerceris kennicottii kennicottii Cresson, 1865

References

Crabronidae
Articles created by Qbugbot
Insects described in 1865